The Brain & Behavior Research Foundation (BBRF) is a nonprofit 501(c)(3) organization that funds mental health research. It was originally called the National Alliance for Research on Schizophrenia & Depression or the acronym for that, NARSAD. It received its nonprofit ruling in 1981.

Mission and work 
BBRF states that it is "committed to alleviating the suffering caused by mental illness by awarding grants that will lead to advances and breakthroughs in scientific research." The Foundation focuses its research grants in the following areas: addiction, ADHD, anxiety, autism, bipolar disorder, borderline personality disorder, depression, eating disorders, OCD, PTSD, schizophrenia, as well as research in suicide prevention. Grant applications (943 in 2019) are assessed by the BBRF Scientific Council. This group of 187 prominent mental health researchers, led by Herbert Pardes, M.D., reviews each grant application and selects those deemed most likely to lead to breakthroughs. A total of 150 Young Investigator grants were made in 2022.

Research funding awarded 
From its inception in 1987 through calendar year 2022, BBRF has awarded over $440 million  to fund more than 6,400 grants to more than 5,300 scientists around the world. The Foundation states that 100% of every dollar donated for research goes to research. BBRF is able to do this thanks to the support of two family foundations which fully cover its operating expenses.

Awards

References

External links 
 Brain & Behavior Research Foundation website

Mental health organizations in New York (state)
Medical and health foundations in the United States
Non-profit organizations based in New York City
Biomedical research foundations